Doorley is a surname. Notable people with the surname include:

James Doorley, Irish businessman
Joseph A. Doorley Jr. (1930-2022), Irish-American lawyer and politician
Sandra Doorley, American lawyer

See also
Dooley
Doorley Creek, a river of Renfrew County, Ontario, Canada
Doorly, a surname